The Lexington Stakes was an American Thoroughbred horse race for three-year-old horses run between 1961 and 2007. A race on turf, the event was run at Aqueduct Racetrack in Queens, New York from inception through 1976 after which it was moved permanently to Belmont Park in Elmont, New York.

Contested at various middle distances, it was run as the Lexington Handicap from inception in 1961 through 1981.

Named for one of America's greatest race horses as well as foundation sires, Lexington (The Blind Hero of Woodburn), the former Graded stakes race finished classified as a Listed event and offered a purse of $100,000.

Historical notes
The inaugural running of the Lexington Handicap took place on November 10, 1961 and was won by Milton Ritzenberg's Wise Ship. The race run at what would be the longest distance in its history at one and five-eighths miles.

In his first start in a stakes race, Mongo won the second edition of the Lexington in 1962 for the Montpelier stable of Marion duPont Scott from the prominent du Pont family. Mongo's win marked the beginning of a very successful career in which he won a number of top turf races including the prestigious Washington, D.C. International Stakes which led to being voted the 1963 American Champion Male Turf Horse.

The popularity of the Lexington with owners and trainers was such that it had to be run in two divisions in 1970, then four consecutive years from 1974 thru 1977.
 In 1982 it was again split into two divisions for what would prove to be the last time. The first division was won by Majesty's Prince while in the second part Royal Roberto was declared the winner after Dew Line was disqualified and set back to fifth.

The 1977 U.S. Triple Crown champion jockey Jean Cruguet was aboard Mac Diarmida when he won the 1978 running of the Lexington defeating the now legendary Hall of Fame gelding John Henry.

Jockey Ángel Cordero Jr. won this race in 1977, 1988, and 1991. In1994 the U. S. Racing Hall of Fame jockey was retired from riding and got his fourth win overall with his first as a trainer when Holy Mountain won the Lexington Stakes.

On July 8, 2007 future Hall of Fame jockey John Velazquez rode Distorted Reality to victory in the final edition of the Lexington.

Records
Speed record:
 1:48.45 @ 1 Distorted Reality (2007)
 1:59.55 @ 1 Lech (1991)

Most wins by a jockey:
 5 – Jerry Bailey (1984, 1985, 1995, 2000, 2002)

Most wins by a trainer:
 4 – William I. Mott (1993, 1995, 2000, 2006)

Most wins by an owner:
 2 – John M. Olin (1969, 1976)
 2 – Tartan Farms (James & Virginia Binger) (1979, 1981)
 2 – Sheikh Mohammed (1993, 2003)

Winners

References

Flat horse races for three-year-olds
Discontinued horse races in New York (state)
Belmont Park
Aqueduct Racetrack
Recurring sporting events established in 1961
Recurring sporting events disestablished in 2007
1961 establishments in New York City
1961 disestablishments in New York (state)